Lasse Lindbjerg (born 15 April 1992) is a retired Danish footballer, who played as a center back.

Lindbjerg has played for FC Vestsjælland, BK Frem, F.C. Copenhagen, AB Tårnby and Greve IF.

Privat life 
Lindbjerg was born in Roskilde Hospital. He has studied physical therapy.

Club career

FC Vestsjælland
After Lindbjergs contract expired in January 2014, he joined FC Vestsjælland in February 2014. Lindbjerg reasoned his transfer to FCV with, that it was difficult to be an youth player in FC Copenhagen, because he didn't get the chance on the first team, to show his qualities.

After 5 months and only 2 league games for FCV, he left the club.

BK Frem
Lindbjerg joined BK Frem in the summer 2012. His first match for BK Frem was 12 August 2012 against Svebølle B&I, were Lindbjerg and BK Frem won 3-0.

FC Copenhagen
In August 2014, Lindbjerg returned to FC Copenhagen, after playing a few friendly matches for FC Copenhagens reserve team. The agreement between FC Copenhagen and Lindbjerg was, that he could train with the first team squad, but he would be playing for the reserves, and playing the cup matches for the first team.

Lindbjerg got extended his contract until the summer 2015, and got moved permanently into the first team squad.

AB Tårnby
After Lindbjerg didn't get his contract with FC Copenhagen extended, he signed a contract with new-promoted Danish 2nd Division club AB Tårnby· He wanted to play on a lower level, so he also could do his job as physiotherapist/physical trainer at the academy of FC Copenhagen.

BK Frem
Lindbjerg joined Boldklubben Frem in February 2017, where he was supposed to play for their second team alongside his job at F.C. Copenhagen as a physical coach for the youth teams.

Greve IF
During 2020, Lindbjerg played a few games for his former childhood club Greve IF. He made one official appearance in the Danish Cup, the rest of his appearances was in friendly games. He left the club again at the end of the year.

Football physiotherapist
In June 2015, Lindbjerg started working as physiotherapist at the academy of FC Copenhagen, School of Excellence. He later also functioned as a physical coach and assistant coach in the youth sector.

In the 2018-19 season, he worked as a physiotherapist for the Danish Superliga team of Lyngby Boldklub, before returning to FC Copenhagen in the summer 2019.

Honours

Club
Copenhagen
 Danish Cup: 2014–15

References

External links
 Lasse Lindbjerg on bkfrem.dk
 
 Lasse Lindbjerg on DBU

1992 births
Living people
Danish men's footballers
People from Roskilde
Danish Superliga players
F.C. Copenhagen players
FC Vestsjælland players
Boldklubben Frem players
Denmark youth international footballers
Association football defenders
AB Tårnby players
Sportspeople from Region Zealand